The Copa de Competencia Adolfo Bullrich, or simply Copa Bullrich, was an official football tournament held from 1903 to 1934 in Argentina. From 1905 to 1915 the championship was contested by clubs playing in the second division of Argentine league system, that were Segunda División (1903-1910) and División Intermedia (1911-1915).

Overview 

The trophy was donated by former mayor of Buenos Aires, Adolfo Bullrich, and named after him. It was contested by teams playing in the second division of Argentine football (Primera B Metropolitana, 1903–10, and División Intermedia, 1911–15). During the first years of existence, Copa Bullrich was contested by senior teams, except in cases where the participating clubs were already playing in Primera División so they registered reserve or youth teams to play the competition.

From 1916, the tournament was renamed "Copa Competencia de División Intermedia", while it progressively lost interest. The last edition was held in 1934 as "Copa Competencia de Segunda División", after several years without being organised.

The Copa Bullrich was relevant for having been the first official title won by several clubs, such as Independiente (1909) or Gimnasia y Esgrima (LP) in 1915.

Clubs that had won the cup playing at second division and were playing in Primera División sent youth or reserve teams to play the tournament, as Belgrano Athletic did in 1905 or Boca Juniors in 1934, among other cases.

List of champions

Titles by club

See also
 Primera B Metropolitana
 Argentine División Intermedia
 Adolfo Bullrich

Notes

References 

Defunct football competitions in Argentina
Recurring events established in 1903
Recurring events disestablished in 1934
1903 establishments in Argentina
1934 disestablishments in Argentina